John Rooney Gilmour (15 June 1901 – 26 February 1963) was a Scottish footballer who played as a left back for Bathgate and Dundee, plus shorter spells with Yeovil & Petters United, Montrose, Brechin City and Dundee United.

He made 369 appearances in the Scottish Football League and Scottish Cup for Dundee between 1923 to 1936, playing in the 1925 Scottish Cup Final, a 2–1 defeat to Celtic. In that match he played at outside left and also filled in at right back at times in his first four years at Dens Park, with 'Napper' Thomson the usual occupant of the left back berth; after Thomson left the club in 1927, Gilmour made the position his own for the next eight seasons.

He made one appearance for the Scotland national team in 1930 and also played once for the Scottish League XI.

References

Sources

External links

London Hearts profile (Scotland)
London Hearts profile (Scottish League)

1901 births
1963 deaths
Scottish footballers
Association football fullbacks
Scotland international footballers
Footballers from Bellshill
Bathgate F.C. players
Dundee F.C. players
Yeovil Town F.C. players
Dundee United F.C. players
Scottish Football League players
Scottish Football League representative players